"Yeah" is a song by American rock band LCD Soundsystem. It was released as a 12-inch single through DFA Records on January 13, 2004. The Crass and Pretentious mixes of "Yeah" later appeared on the CD version of the band's eponymous debut studio album. The song peaked at number 77 on the UK Singles Chart.

Overview
In a 2005 interview with Pitchfork, LCD Soundsystem frontman James Murphy regarded "Yeah" as the hardest song to make for their debut studio album, stating that it "nearly killed" him. According to Pitchforks longform article "You Were There", the song "aims to sum up three decades of dance music."

Track listing
DFA Records — dfa 2133 — 12" vinyl single

Personnel
Personnel adapted from single liner notes.

Eric Broucek – additional programming, percussion, vocals
Mandy Coon – vocals
The DFA – mixing, production
Tim Goldsworthy – bass synthesizer
James Murphy – bass, drums, keyboards, percussion, vocals
Rayna Russom – Fun Machine support, synthesizer, synthesizer support
Nancy Whang – vocals

Charts

Release history

References

2004 singles
2004 songs
LCD Soundsystem songs